Tubeway Army were a London-based new wave band led by lead singer Gary Numan. Formed at the height of punk rock in 1977 the band gradually changed to an electronic sound. They were the first band of the electronic era to have a synthesiser-based number-one hit, with their single "Are 'Friends' Electric?" and its parent album Replicas both topping the UK charts in mid-1979. After its release, Numan opted to drop the Tubeway Army name and release music under his own name as he was the sole songwriter, producer and public face of the band, but he retained the musicians from Tubeway Army as his backing band.

History

Early years
Aged 18 years, Gary Webb had fronted London band Mean Street in 1976 (their song "Bunch of Stiffs" appeared on the Live at the Vortex compilation, and was the B-side of the Vortex 7-inch). After leaving this band, he auditioned as lead guitarist for another band called The Lasers, where he met bass-player Paul Gardiner. The Lasers soon became Tubeway Army, and were eventually reformed with Webb's uncle Jess Lidyard on drums. Webb rechristened himself "Valerian", Gardiner "Scarlett" and Lidyard "Rael".

Webb was a prolific songwriter. The band began playing gigs on the punk scene in London and via demo recordings (later released as The Plan) managed to secure a record deal with the independent Beggars Banquet label. They released two guitar-heavy, punk-style singles in the first half of 1978 ("That's Too Bad"/"Oh! Didn't I Say", and "Bombers"/"Blue Eyes"/"OD Receiver"). These failed to chart.

During this time the band went through some line-up changes, changing drummers and briefly adding a second guitarist, but due to musical differences Webb and Gardiner split with them as they wanted to move away from punk rock.

By this time Tubeway Army had decided to abandon live shows – Webb was unhappy with pub-venue gigs on the often violent London punk scene. Their last gig in July 1978 (sharing the bill with The Skids) was abandoned halfway through the set because of violence and Webb decided that Tubeway Army would become a studio-only band. (There are only 2 known recordings of Tubeway Army concerts – Live at the Roxy in 1977 and a London show from February 1978 – this was released as a bootleg album in the early 1980s. It was later officially included under the title Living Ornaments '78 as bonus tracks on the 1998 CD re-release of the Tubeway Army album).

Debut album
Soon afterwards, the Tubeway Army album was quickly recorded by the original line-up. At this point Webb adopted the name "Gary Numan", taking his new pseudonym from a local Yellow Pages where a plumber called "Arthur Neumann" was listed, the singer abandoning the German spelling, to become Numan. Whilst still largely guitar/bass/drums-based, the album saw his first tentative use of the Minimoog synthesizer, which he had come across by accident in the recording studio during the album sessions. Lyrically the record touched on dystopian and sci-fi themes similar to those employed by authors J. G. Ballard and Philip K. Dick, of whom Numan was a fan (the opening lines of the song "Listen to the Sirens" are a direct lift from the title of Dick's book Flow My Tears, The Policeman Said). 

At this point Numan was keen to distance his music from punk rock and wanted to drop the Tubeway Army group name and release the album under his own stage name, but the idea was rejected by Beggars Banquet and the album was released with the title Tubeway Army on blue vinyl in November 1978. Whilst the album's modest initial pressing of 5000 copies sold out, it did not enter the album charts at that time, and no singles were lifted from it.

Replicas and commercial success
Following swiftly on, Numan took Tubeway Army back into the studio to record their follow-up album, Replicas and also a session for John Peel in early 1979. The result was more synth and science fiction oriented than the last album. The first single from the album, the bleak, slow-paced keyboard-driven song "Down in the Park" failed to chart, although it would prove an enduring cult track in the years to come, and has to date been covered by Marilyn Manson, Foo Fighters, Flight, and nine other bands. 

The next single, "Are 'Friends' Electric?" was very successful, reaching the No. 1 spot. By the end of 1979 it had become the fourth highest selling single in the UK that year. The underlying context of this song was also a reference to another Philip K. Dick novel, Do Androids Dream of Electric Sheep? A special picture-disc helped boost sales but what particularly grabbed the British public's imagination was Tubeway Army's appearance on the BBC show The Old Grey Whistle Test, followed soon after by a slot on Top of the Pops on 24 May 1979. The band, now including Ultravox keyboardist Billy Currie, Chris Payne, Paul Gardiner and drummer Cedric Sharpley, appeared all dressed in black and near-motionless, Numan in particular giving a performance often referred to as being "like an android" (a style that was later reported to have been a means of covering stage nerves but which then became his trademark). The single remained at number one in the UK charts for four weeks, with Replicas following suit in the album charts. With Tubeway Army still avoiding live shows, Numan recruited some additional musicians to make these television appearances (see above).

At the peak of success, a John Peel session in June 1979 was credited as Gary Numan, and the Tubeway Army group name was dropped. Numan would however keep the same musicians as his backing band on his subsequent solo releases and tours.

Personnel

Members
 Gary Numan (a.k.a. "Valerian") – guitar, lead vocals, synthesizers (1977-1979)
 Paul Gardiner (a.k.a. "Scarlett") – bass, backing vocals (1977–1979; died 1984)
 Jess Lidyard (a.k.a. "Rael") – drums (1977, 1978–1979)
 Bob Simmonds – drums (1977–1978)
 Barry Benn – drums (1978)
 Sean Burke – guitar (1978)
 Billy Currie – synthesizers (1979)
 Trevor Grant – guitar (1979)
 Chris Payne – synthesizers (1979)
 Cedric Sharpley – drums (1979; died 2012)

Lineups

Timeline

Discography

Studio albums

Compilations

Singles

Notes

References

Further reading
Goodwin, Paul (2004) Electric Pioneer: An Armchair Guide To Gary Numan

English new wave musical groups
English synth-pop groups
Musical groups established in 1976
Musical groups disestablished in 1979
1976 establishments in England
1979 disestablishments in England
Musical groups from London
British synth-pop new wave groups
English post-punk music groups
Beggars Banquet Records artists